Belm is a municipality in the district of Osnabrück, in Lower Saxony, Germany. It is located in the Wiehengebirge, approximately 7 km northeast of Osnabrück, and is therefore part of the city-agglomeration of Osnabrück. It is seated in the middle of the TERRA.vita Nature Park. Two little right tributaries of the river Hase flow through it.

The municipality is divided into 5 boroughs: Belm, Powe, Icker, Haltern and Vehrte

International relations

Belm is twinned with:

  Elterlein, Germany, since 2004
  Kolno, Poland, since 2006
  Englewood, USA, since 2007

Famous people
 Ingo Petzke (born September 18, 1947), an internationally acknowledged German film scholar, filmmaker and author
 Sascha Weidner (born August 1, 1974, died April 9, 2015), German photographer and artist

References

Osnabrück (district)